Frank Wesley Fenno Jr. (September 11, 1902 – Aug 16, 1973) was a decorated submarine commander during World War II who reached the rank of Rear Admiral in the United States Navy.

Frank Wesley Fenno Jr. was born to Frank Wesley and Mary Alice Fenno (née Nichols) in Westminster, Massachusetts, 11 September 1902. He attended Fitchburg High School, before moving on to the University of Maine, and later to the United States Naval Academy in Annapolis, Maryland in 1921. Fenno was a 1925 graduate of Annapolis, and began his Naval career in the Boston Naval Yard. In 1929 he joined the crew of the USS Utah and later the USS Florida. Fenno attended the submarine training course at New London, Connecticut, and was assigned to S-37 and was later assigned to S-31.

World War II
At the beginning of World War II, Fenno was in command of the USS Trout (SS-202).

References

1902 births
1973 deaths
People from Westminster, Massachusetts
United States Naval Academy alumni
United States Navy rear admirals
United States Navy personnel of World War II
Recipients of the Navy Cross (United States)
Recipients of the Distinguished Service Cross (United States)
Recipients of the Silver Star
Recipients of the Legion of Merit
Military personnel from Massachusetts